Greatest Hits contains all of Evelyn King's biggest hits, including "Shame," "I Don't Know If It's Right," "Love Come Down" and "I'm in Love".  Her other hits, such as "Get Loose," "I'm So Romantic" and "Give Me One Reason" are not included.

Track listing
 Shame (12" version)
 I Don't Know If It's Right (7" version)
 Music Box (12" version)
 Out There (7" version)
 Let's Get Funky Tonight 
 I'm in Love (12" version)
 Don't Hide Our Love (7" version)
 Spirit of the Dancer
 Love Come Down (12" version)
 Betcha She Don't Love You (12" version)
 Action
 Shake Down
 Teenager
 Just for the Night (12" version)
 Out of Control
 Till Midnight
 Your Personal Touch (Dance Version)
 High Horse

External links

2001 compilation albums
Evelyn "Champagne" King albums